Joshua Michael Ockimey (born October 18, 1995) is an American professional baseball first baseman who is a free agent. The Boston Red Sox selected him in the fifth round of the 2014 Major League Baseball draft.

Career

Boston Red Sox
Ockimey attended Saints John Neumann and Maria Goretti Catholic High School. In his freshman year, he had a .466 batting average with 15 runs scored and 25 runs batted in (RBIs), and was named The Philadelphia Inquirers Southeastern Pennsylvania high school rookie of the year. He initially committed to attend the University of Arkansas, but changed his commitment to Indiana University Bloomington after Arkansas made personnel changes. As a senior, Ockimey batted .500 with 28 runs and 34 RBIs. The Boston Red Sox selected him in the fifth round, with the 164th overall selection, of the 2014 MLB draft. He signed with the Red Sox rather than attend college.

Ockimey struggled in his professional debut, batting .188 in 36 games with the Gulf Coast Red Sox of the Rookie-level Gulf Coast League. Playing for the Lowell Spinners of the Class A-Short Season New York-Penn League in 2015, he batted .266 in 56 games. Ockimey spent the 2016 season with the Greenville Drive of the Class A South Atlantic League where he posted a .226 batting average with 18 home runs and 62 RBIs. He began the 2017 season with the Salem Red Sox of the Class A-Advanced Carolina League, and was promoted to the Portland Sea Dogs of the Double-A Eastern League in August. He batted a combined .274 with 14 home runs and 74 RBIs along with a .799 OPS between both teams.

Ockimey returned to Portland for the start of the 2018 season. In 90 games with the Sea Dogs, he batted .254 with 15 home runs and 56 RBIs. On August 3, Ockimey was promoted to the Pawtucket Red Sox of the Triple-A International League, appearing in 27 games while batting .215 with five home runs and 15 RBIs. Ockimey spent the 2019 season with Pawtucket, appearing in 122 games while batting .204 with 25 home runs and 57 RBIs. After the 2020 minor league season was canceled, he was re-signed by the Red Sox in early November to a minor-league deal for the 2021 season. He spent the 2021 season with the Worcester Red Sox, batting .225 with 15 home runs and 45 RBIs in 98 games.

Philadelphia Phillies
On February 15, 2022, Ockimey signed a minor league contract with the Philadelphia Phillies organization. He elected free agency on November 10, 2022.

Personal life
Ockimey has a twin brother, Michael, who plays college football as a linebacker for Thaddeus Stevens Community College. He has a tattoo on his arm of Romans 8:31.

References

External links

SoxProspects.com

1995 births
Living people
Baseball players from Philadelphia
Baseball first basemen
Gulf Coast Red Sox players
Lowell Spinners players
Greenville Drive players
Twin sportspeople
Salem Red Sox players
Portland Sea Dogs players
Pawtucket Red Sox players
Worcester Red Sox players